Ocinebrina corallinoides is a species of sea snail, a marine gastropod mollusk in the family Muricidae, the murex snails or rock snails.

Description
The length of the shell attains 9.6 mm.

The variety Ocinebrina corallinus var. major Pallary, 1900 is a synonym of Ocinebrina aciculata aciculata (Lamarck, 1822): synonym of Ocinebrina aciculata (Lamarck, 1822)

Distribution
This marine species occurs in the Gulf of Gabès, Tunisia

References

 Houart, R. (2001). A review of the Recent Mediterranean and Northeastern Atlantic species of Muricidae. Evolver, Roma, 227 pp.
 Cecalupo A., Buzzurro G. & Mariani M., 2008. Contributo alla conoscenza della macrofauna del Golfo di Gabès (Tunisia). Quaderni della Civica Stazione Idrobiologica di Milano, 31: 1-173, pl. 1-92.

External links
 Pallary, P. (1912). Sur la faune de l'ancienne lagune de Tunis. Bulletin de la Société d'Histoire Naturelle de l'Afrique du Nord. 4 (9): 215-228
 Crocetta F., Bonomolo G., Albano P.G., Barco A., Houart R. & Oliverio M. (2012) The status of the northeastern Atlantic and Mediterranean small mussel drills of the Ocinebrina aciculata complex (Mollusca: Gastropoda: Muricidae), with the description of a new species. Scientia Marina 76(1): 177–189
  Barco, A.; Aissaoui, C.; Houart, R.; Bonomolo, G.; Crocetta, F. & Oliverio, M. (2018). Revision of the Ocinebrina aciculata species complex (Mollusca: Gastropoda: Muricidae) in the northeastern Atlantic Ocean and Mediterranean Sea. Journal of Molluscan Studies. 84 (1): 19-29

Ocenebrinae
Gastropods described in 1912